Discovered by Karl Schwarzschild, the Schwarzschild criterion is a criterion in astrophysics where a stellar medium is stable against convection when the rate of change in temperature (T) by altitude (Z) satisfies

If a gas is unstable against convection then if an element is displaced upwards its buoyancy will cause it to keep rising or, if it is displaced downwards, it is denser than its surroundings and will continue to sink.  Therefore, the Schwarzschild criterion dictates whether an element of a star will rise or sink if displaced by random fluctuations within the star or if the forces the element experiences will return it to its original position.

For the Schwarzschild criterion to hold the displaced element must have a bulk velocity which is highly subsonic.  If this is the case then the time over which the pressures surrounding the element changes is much longer than the time it takes for a sound wave to travel through the element and smooth out pressure differences between the element and its surroundings.  If this were not the case the element would not hold together as it traveled through the star.

In order to keep rising or sinking in the star the displaced element must not be able to become the same density as the gas surrounding it.  In other words, it must respond adiabatically to its surroundings.  In order for this to be true it must move fast enough for there to be insufficient time for the element to exchange heat with its surroundings.

See also
Archimedes' principle
Brunt–Väisälä frequency
Convection

References

Astrophysics